Arcachon is known for the Arcachonnaise, the local name for an Arcachon villa, which is the architectural style of many of the older houses built in France. It is a type of Victorian architecture.

See also
Arcachon Bay
Communes of the Gironde department

Buildings and structures in Gironde

Vernacular architecture